The New Zealand women's national cricket team toured England between May and August 1966. They played against England in three Test matches, with all three matches being drawn.

Squads

Tour Matches

1-day single innings match: Middlesex v New Zealand

1-day single innings match: Kent v New Zealand

2-day match: East of England v New Zealand

1-day single innings match: East Anglia v New Zealand

1-day single innings match: Midlands v New Zealand

1-day match: Northern Counties v New Zealand

2-day match: North of England v New Zealand

1-day single innings match: Yorkshire v New Zealand

1-day single innings match: Midlands v New Zealand

1-day single innings match: Midlands v New Zealand

2-day match: West of England v New Zealand

1-day single innings match: Western Counties v New Zealand

1-day single innings match: Sussex v New Zealand

2-day match: South of England v New Zealand

1-day single innings match: Surrey v New Zealand

2-day match: Women's Cricket Association v New Zealand

1-day single innings match: Young England v New Zealand

1-day single innings match: Women's Cricket Association President's XI v New Zealand

1-day single innings match: Buckinghamshire v New Zealand

WTest Series

1st Test

2nd Test

3rd Test

References

External links
New Zealand Women tour of England 1966 from Cricinfo

Women's cricket tours of England
1966 in English cricket
New Zealand women's national cricket team tours